Parliamentary elections were held in the Czech Republic on 19 and 20 June 1998. The result was a victory for the Czech Social Democratic Party, which won 74 of the 200 seats. Voter turnout was 73.9%.

Background
The Civic Democratic Party (ODS) had won the 1996 parliamentary elections. The party's leader, Václav Klaus, then formed a minority government supported by the Czech Social Democratic Party (ČSSD). The government lasted until 1998, when it resigned during a political crisis that caused the division of ODS and the disintegration of the ruling coalition. Snap elections was called for June 1998.

Campaign
The ODS was weakened by the creation of a new party, the Freedom Union (US). The US was formed by former members of ODS who had left after a conflict with Václav Klaus. The ODS was polling at around 10%, with the US expected to replace it as the major right-wing party. The ČSSD was expected to win by large margin. The ODS launched their campaign with warnings that a new government would contain Communist members and used its leader Klaus heavily during the campaign. The ČSSD criticised the work of Klaus' cabinet and recycled slogans used during 1996 campaign, as well as promising to fight against corruption.

Finances

Opinion polls

Results

References

Czech Republic
Elections to the Chamber of Deputies of the Czech Republic
Legislative
Czech